In China, the governor is the head of government of a province. There are currently 22 provincial governors under PRC control; in China's five autonomous regions, the analogous head of the provincial government is officially titled a chairman, not a governor.

Legal basis 
In the Constitution of the Republic of China promulgated on December 25, 1947, Chapter XI, Article 113, Section 2 describes that in each province, there shall be a provincial government with a provincial governor who shall be elected by the people of the province. This was codified in Article 9, Section 1 in the Additional Articles of the Constitution of the Republic of China in 2005.

Source of talent 
Most if not all governors are not local to the provinces they are appointed to govern.

In many cases, they are from outside the province and are graduates of the Central Party School of the Chinese Communist Party or CCP affiliated education institutions. Most governors were deputy governors, bureaucrats in central government offices or officials from others departments of the CCP such as the Communist Youth League.

Some governors have been rotated from other provinces from poorer provinces to richer coastal provinces. Other previous governors have been appointed positions within the central government. Some previous governors have become party chiefs of their respective provinces.

References 

Gubernatorial titles